Show Business at War is a short film made by The March of Time in 1943 to tout the United States film industry's contribution to the Second World War effort. It was a collaboration between several studios, directors and actors.

References

External links

1943 films
1943 short films
Films directed by Louis de Rochemont
Documentary films about Hollywood, Los Angeles
American World War II propaganda shorts
The March of Time films
20th Century Fox short films
American black-and-white films
American short documentary films
1943 documentary films
1940s short documentary films
1940s English-language films
1940s American films